Cape Kidson is an abrupt rock scarp which rises to , forming the north side of the entrance to New Bedford Inlet, on the east coast of Palmer Land, Antarctica. It was first sighted and photographed from the air by members of the United States Antarctic Service in 1940. During 1947 the cape was photographed from the air by the Ronne Antarctic Research Expedition, who in conjunction with the Falkland Islands Dependencies Survey (FIDS) charted it from the ground. It was named by the FIDS for Edward Kidson, a New Zealand meteorologist and author of the meteorological reports of the British Antarctic Expedition, 1907–09, under Ernest Shackleton, and of the Australasian Antarctic Expedition under Douglas Mawson, 1911–14.

References

Headlands of Palmer Land